Acallis is a genus of moths of the family Pyralidae.

Species
Acallis alticolalis (Dyar, 1910)
Acallis amblytalis (Dyar, 1914)
Acallis gripalis (Hulst, 1886)
Acallis xantippe (Dyar, 1914)

References

Chrysauginae
Pyralidae genera
Taxa named by Émile Louis Ragonot